Michurinsky District  is an administrative and municipal district (raion), one of the twenty-three in Tambov Oblast, Russia. It is located in the northwest of the oblast. The district borders with Pervomaysky District in the north, Nikiforovsky District in the east, Petrovsky District in the south, and with Dobrovsky District of Lipetsk Oblast in the west. Its administrative center is the town of Michurinsk (which is not administratively a part of the district). Population: 34,245 (2010 Census);

Administrative and municipal status
Within the framework of administrative divisions, Michurinsky District is one of the twenty-three in the oblast. The town of Michurinsk serves as its administrative center, despite being incorporated separately as a town of oblast significance—an administrative unit with the status equal to that of the districts.

As a municipal division, the district is incorporated as Michurinsky Municipal District. The town of oblast significance of Michurinsk is incorporated separately from the district as Michurinsk Urban Okrug.

Notable residents 

Afanasy Grigoriev (1782–1868), Neoclassical architect, born in Vasilievskaya
Afanasiy Remnyov (1890–1919), Soviet soldier during the Russian Civil War

See also
 Glazok

References

Sources

Districts of Tambov Oblast
